Nova Sušica is a village southwest of Pivka in the Inner Carniola region of Slovenia.

History
In 1994, territory from Nadanje Selo, Mala Pristava, Nova Sušica, and Stara Sušica was combined to create Ribnica as a separate settlement.

Church
The local church in the settlement is dedicated to Saint Anne and belongs to the Parish of Košana.

Cultural heritage

The Ambrožič Mill in Nova Sušica has been registered as technical cultural heritage. It consists of a sawmill, grain mill, and house dating from the 19th century. It is located at Nova Sušica 37 and 37a along the main road from Ribnica to Divača on the right bank of the Reka River.

References

External links

Nova Sušica on Geopedia

Populated places in the Municipality of Pivka